Kan 11 is an Israeli state-owned free-to-air television channel. Operated by the Israeli Public Broadcasting Corporation (IPBC), it launched on 15 May 2017, replacing Channel 1 after the closure of the Israel Broadcasting Authority. It is one of the six free-to-air channels in the country.

Production
Kan 11 has produced various original shows, including Israeli adaptations of The Chase, and Carpool Karaoke, as well as many in-house productions.

Programming

News and current affairs
 Evening News (Hadashot HaErev) – the main news program primarily presented by Michal Rabinovich (most of the programme is also broadcast every evening by Radio "Kan Bet")
 Erev Erev (Every Evening) – presented by Dov Gilhar, Keren Uzan and Rinat Spivak
 Night News (Hadashot HaLaila) 
 Real Time with Asaf Liberman (investigations)
 Friday at 5pm – presented by Uri Levi
 News of the Week (Hadashot Shishi weekly magazine, replacing Yoman – Diary)
 Shabbat News (Hadashot HaShabbat) – the Saturday evening news program
 The World Today (HaOlam Hayom) – presented by Moav Vardi (international news magazine)
 From the Other Side (Mehatsad Hasheni) – presented by Guy Zohar
 Pocket Games (Mishakei Hakis) – presented by Shaul Amsterdamsky (financial news magazine)

Entertainment
 Culture Agent
 Ad Kan! – A satire program about the political situation in Israel.
Carpool Karaoke – Hosted by Nicky Goldstein (based on the segment on The Late Late Show)
The Container – Hosted by  Itai Mautner
The Chase (Hebrew: המרדף, Ha-Mirdaf) – Hosted by Lucy Ayoub (based on a British format)
Pa'am Beshavua
Halaila
The 1% Club (Hebrew: האחוזון העליון, HaAkhuzon HaElyon) – Hosted by Shahar Hason (based on a British format)

Documentary
 Bein Hashmashot
 Ve Ha'aretz Hayta Toho Va Boho
 The Storytellers' Festival

Comedy
 Zehu Ze! – Satirical and comic stories about the life in contemporary Israel (COVID-19 pandemic special).
 Hayeudim Baim – Satirical and comic stories about various periods in the Jewish history.
 Kupa Rashit – Situation comedy about a supermarket.
 Shabas  – Situation comedy about a prison.

Action
 Tehran – About a secret Israeli agent in Tehran.
 Maniac – An action series about the police.
 Valley of Tears

Drama and crime
 Borgen (Ha-Memshala, "The Government" in English)
 Chicago Justice

Comedy
 Great News, comedy series.
 The Good Place, Comedy Series

Documentary 
Planet Earth II

Entertainment
 Eurovision Song Contest

Sports
 FIFA World Cup

High definition
The channel has been broadcast in high-definition television since its launch. It also aired coverage of the 2018 FIFA World Cup in 4K ultra-high-definition.

References

External links

Television channels and stations established in 2017
Television channels in Israel
2017 establishments in Israel